Joubert Prinsloo Horn (born 8 October 1988) is a former South African rugby union player whose usual playing position was lock.

Rugby career

However, his return to South Africa was short-lived and he moved to French Fédérale 1 side Soyaux Angoulême XV Charente prior to the 2014–2015 season.

In September 2015, he signed with Aviron Bayonnais for the 2015–2016 season, replacing Mark Chisholm. He will make his first appearance in Rugby Pro D2.

References

1988 births
Living people
Afrikaner people
Alumni of Grey College, Bloemfontein
Griffons (rugby union) players
Griquas (rugby union) players
Rugby union locks
Rugby union players from Welkom
South African rugby union players